P-series fuels are a family of renewable, non-petroleum, liquid fuels that can substitute for gasoline. The blend of methyl tetrahydrofuran (MTHF), ethanol, and hydrocarbon constitute the P-series fuel. These fuels are clear, high-octane alternative fuels that can be used in flexible fuel vehicles. It addresses 3 problems: the need for non-petroleum energy sources, solid waste management, and affordability. The feedstock is not incinerated, but chemically digested, so there is no combustion with the accompanying toxic air emissions.

External links
 DOE Alternative Fuels Data Center – Emerging Alternative Fuels
 Institute for Analysis of Global Securities web site
 An Optimized Alternative Motor Fuel Formulation: Natural Gas Liquids Ethanol and a Biomass-Derived Ether
 

Fuels